is a railway station in Bungo-Ōno, Ōita Prefecture, Japan. It is operated by JR Kyushu and is on the Hōhi Main Line.

Lines

Layout 
The station consists of two side platforms serving two tracks. The station building is an old wooden structure where the floorspace is shared with a post office and the local tourism information centre. Access to the opposite side platform is by means of a level crossing. The station is not staffed by JR Kyushu but some types of tickets are available from a kan'i itaku agent who staffs the ticket window.

Adjacent stations

History
The track was extended westwards in phases, with  opening as the new western terminus on 23 November 1922. On the same day, this station was opened as an intermediate station on the track with the name , after the village the station was located in. On 2 December 1928, the entire track from Kumamoto through Makiguchi to Ōita was designated as the Hōhi Main Line. With the privatization of Japanese National Railways (JNR), the successor of JGR, on 1 April 1987, the station came under the control of JR Kyushu. On 1 November 1990, the station was renamed Bungo-Kiyokawa.

On 17 September 2017, Typhoon Talim (Typhoon 18) damaged the Hōhi Main Line at several locations. Services between Aso and Nakahanda, including Bungo-Kiyokawa, were suspended and replaced by bus services. Rail service from Aso to Miemachi was restored by 22 September 2017 Normal rail services between Aso and Ōita were restored by 2 October 2017.

Passenger statistics
In fiscal 2015, there were a total of 23,394  boarding passengers, giving a daily average of 64 passengers.

See also
List of railway stations in Japan

References

External links
Bungo-Kiyokawa (JR Kyushu)

Railway stations in Ōita Prefecture
Railway stations in Japan opened in 1922
Bungo-ōno, Ōita